Suong is a municipality (krong)  of Tboung Khmum Province in eastern Cambodia.

Administration

References

External links
The former Kampong Cham at Royal Government of Cambodia website
The former Kampong Cham at Ministry of Commerce website

Provinces of Cambodia
Districts of Tboung Khmum province